Ishwar Maraj (born January 26, 1969) is a Canadian cricketer. He is a left-handed batsman and a right-arm offbreak bowler.

Before his move to Canada he played club cricket in Trinidad and Tobago. He holds the world record for the slowest ever fifty in a World Cup match, in an innings against South Africa, in the 2003 Cricket World Cup, in which he played in all six matches. He last game for Canada was in the 2004 ICC 6 Nations Challenge, although he did play for Canada A against the MCC in 2005. He played for St Lucia in the 2006 Stanford 20/20 tournament.

In February 2020, he was named in the West Indies' squad for the Over-50s Cricket World Cup in South Africa. However, the tournament was cancelled during the third round of matches due to the coronavirus pandemic.

References

External links
Cricket Archive  profile
Ishwar Maraj at Cricinfo

1969 births
Living people
Canadian cricketers
Canada One Day International cricketers
Cricketers at the 2003 Cricket World Cup
Trinidad and Tobago emigrants to Canada
Trinidad and Tobago Hindus
Canadian people of Indian descent
Trinidad and Tobago cricketers